The men's pole vault event at the 1999 Pan American Games was held on July 27, 1999.

Results

References

Athletics at the 1999 Pan American Games
1999